A reading book or basal reader is a book used to teach children.

Reading book may also refer to:
Book, a book used to record information
Textbook, a book for standard work
Comic book, a book of comic strips
Novel, a long work of narrative form
Chapter book, a book for intermediate readers
Encyclopedia, a book providing summaries of knowledge
Dictionary, a book for definitions

See also
Reading
Book (disambiguation)